Buses are the main form of public transport in Bristol, England.  Most bus services are operated by First West of England. Other companies offering services include Abus, Citistar, The Big Lemon, Transpora Bus, Stagecoach West and Newport Bus.

History 

Horse-bus services in Bristol were started in 1887 by the Bristol Tramways & Carriage Company, with a service from the Victoria Rooms (connecting with the trams) to Clifton. The horse-buses were replaced by motor buses from 1906, first on a service from the city centre to Clifton.

From 1887 to 1986, Bristol Tramways (renamed Bristol Omnibus Company in 1957) had an almost complete monopoly of bus services in and from Bristol.  The exceptions were in the 1920s, when Greyhound Motors provided competition until taken over by Bristol Tramways in 1928; a few small independent operators, the last of which, the Dundry Pioneer, was acquired in 1950; and Red & White Services, which started joint services with Bristol Omnibus Company to South Wales when the Severn Bridge opened in 1966.

Between 1937 and 1978 Bristol Omnibus Company was the operating partner in Bristol Joint Service (BJS)  a joint undertaking with Bristol Corporation which controlled bus services within the city (and initially also its trams). The company owned and operated the buses, and shared revenues with the Corporation.  BJS included services to suburbs outside the city limits (e.g. Filton, Patchway, Staple Hill and Kingswood).

Bus services expanded steadily between the wars.  Between 1938 and 1941 Bristol's tramways were abandoned, and buses replaced the tram routes.

Bristol Tramways was state-owned from 1948.  Expansion of services continued, to serve the new estates built on the edges of the city.  But from 1954 passenger numbers started to decline. Most services started from the Centre, Prince Street or Old Market, although the tram replacement services started between 1938 and 1941 were mostly cross-city routes.  In 1958 routes were linked, so that almost all routes ran across the city.  This was to reduce congestion caused by standing buses in the central area, and also to provide better access to the new Broadmead shopping area.

In 1969 the company, now known as Bristol Omnibus Company, was transferred to the National Bus Company.

By 1973, growing congestion was again creating delays and unreliable timing on the long cross-city routes, and some services were again split.
In 1978 the end of Bristol Joint Services enabled city services to be linked with routes in the eastern suburbs which were well outside the city boundaries.  In 1981, limited stop express services were started to the outer suburbs, initially under the Clipper brand.  Also in 1981 the NBC's Market Analysis Project triggered more changes, with the abandonment of some long-established routes.

In 1980 the Thatcher government embarked on a programme of privatisation and deregulation of bus services. In preparation the company was split into two operating units in 1983: the city services, which in 1985 adopted the brand Bristol City Line, and the country services, which in 1986 became a separate company, Badgerline Limited. Badgerline was sold to its management in 1986, and the original company was sold in 1987 to Midland Red West, who kept the City Line brand.

Deregulation meant that Badgerline was able to begin bus services within the city, in competition with City Line. However, in 1988 Midland Red West was itself acquired by Badgerline, so that Bristol's bus services were again controlled by a single company.

In 1995 Badgerline merged with GRT Group to become FirstBus, later renamed FirstGroup. First adopted a policy of common branding, and the City Line and Badgerline brands were dropped.

In 1998 bus services were extended to serve the new out of town shopping centre at Cribbs Causeway, where a new bus station was built.

A few small independent operators have competed with Badgerline, City Line and FirstGroup since deregulation. Bugler Coaches ran a few tendered local services from 1988. Abus began with a competing service to Keynsham in 1991. South Gloucestershire Bus & Coach built up a small network of local services from 1997 until it was taken over in 2007 by Wessex Bus.  However, the independents have been unable to shake the dominance of FirstGroup.

Long distance coach services are provided from Bristol by National Express and Megabus. Previously Bakers Dolphin operated a service to London.

Buses were first operated in Bristol in 1887 by the Bristol Tramways & Carriage Company, a company which still operates, after several changes of name, as First Somerset & Avon. The company had an almost complete monopoly of bus services in the city until deregulation in 1986. Since then there has been a variety of operators.

Between 2016/17 and 2021/22 the distance covered by Bristol buses fell by 30%.

Bus routes 

The four councils in the Greater Bristol area are working to improve bus transport on ten corridors, designated the Greater Bristol Bus Network. The corridors are due for completion by 2012. 

MetroBus is a network of three express bus routes which serves many areas of Bristol. The T1 connects Bristol to Thornbury.

Coach services 

The main operator of long distance coach services from Bristol is National Express, departing from Bristol bus station. But Megabus also operate long distance services. Special services operate to sporting venues such as Twickenham Stadium and Wembley Stadium for major sporting events. Megabus operates four services that serve Bristol, they stop opposite the Colston Hall, City Centre and at University of West England Frenchay. They provide direct services to and from London, The South West, South Wales and The Midlands. Tickets are also available to through destinations such as Paris and Brussels with a change in London.

Night services 
Prior to 24 March 2013 there were 6 night buses (N1, N2, N3, N4, N5, N6) running across the Bristol area every Saturday and Sunday morning midnight until 6am operated by Wessex Bus, this was at a cost of £40,000 a year to Bristol City Council. This agreement was subsequently replaced by Bristol City Council to subsidise First Bristol to run buses 6 nights a week with an initial subsidy of £60,000 with a view to First taking on the services on a commercial basis once they become established. Late night services formerly ran on the following routes.
43 City Centre to Kingswood (24/7)
48 City Centre to Downend (24/7)
49 City Centre to Staple Hill (24/7)
70 UWE Frenchay to City Centre (24/7)
75/76 Cribbs Causeway to Hengrove (24/7) 

Night services were withdrawn during the COVID-19 pandemic.

Park and ride 

Currently there are four park & ride services operating in Bristol these are, to the city centre from the A4 Portway, A4 Bath Road and Long Ashton park & ride car parks. The sites are operational all year round from Monday to Saturday.
Brislington P&R: Brislington Park & Ride to City Centre
Portway P&R: Portway Park & Ride to City Centre 
m2: Long Ashton Park & Ride to City Centre

Two smaller Park & Ride sites are served by local bus services rather than a dedicated P&R bus service.
These sites are:
Lyde Green (served by 49, 86, 462, m3/m3x) 
Yate (served by 86, 202, Y1, Y3, Y4, Y6)

There have also been plans from Bristol City Council to build a fourth park and ride site just off the M32 near Stapleton, although  no development has started.
The 903 has been renumbered and re-routed as number m2 metrobus.

Airport services 
The Airport Flyer (A1) operates a frequent service on one route from Bristol bus station, Bristol city centre and Temple Meads station to Bristol Airport. The A2 no longer runs from Bristol but has in part replaced the withdrawn 121, running from Weston-super-Mare, through Nailsea and to the airport. The above services are operated by First West of England respectively. The A4 runs from Bath to the airport and is operated by Bath Bus Company using a mixture of three types of double decker.

In October 2018, the A1 service was re-routed along the guided busway in South Bristol. The previous route through Bedminster is operated by a new service A2 branded as Air Connect which runs every 30 minutes. The A2 uses the bus stops on The Haymarket as its start/terminus points in the city instead of the bus station.

Greater Bristol Bus Network (GBBN) 
The Greater Bristol Bus Network (GBBN) also known as showcase bus routes are being developed by First in partnership with local government, to improve services with new buses, real time passenger information systems and traffic management measures.

Bristol bus station 

The Bristol bus station is at Marlborough Street, near the Broadmead shopping area. It was opened in 1958, and was redeveloped in 2006.

The station is managed by First West of England. There are 19 bays. The station has a First Travel shop, National Express shop, National Express information desk, a café, shop, security office and toilets.

The bus station is used by the Bristol Airport Flyer service to the airport, most First Somerset & Avon express (X) and country services, and Stagecoach South West services to Taunton, Exeter and Plymouth. National Express services, as well as some services by other operators to destinations such as Yate and Cheddar, also use the station.

See also 
Public transport in Bristol
MetroBus (Bristol)

References

Sources 
Hulin, P (1974) Bristol's Buses Published by the author
Curtis, C and Walker, M (2007) Bristol Omnibus Services: The Green Years Millstream Books

External links

Bus transport in Bristol
Bus transport in England